Detroit City may refer to:

 Detroit, a city in the U.S. state of Michigan
 Detroit City (horse), a thoroughbred horse
 "Detroit City" (song), made popular by Bobby Bare, Tom Jones and Dean Martin
 Detroit City Football Club, an association football (soccer) club based in Detroit, Michigan
 Detroit City Apartments, a residential high-rise in Detroit, Michigan